The Pearl Jam 2008 United States Tour was a concert tour by the American rock band Pearl Jam.

History
The tour of the United States consisted of thirteen dates which focused on the East Coast. The tour included a headlining appearance on June 14, 2008 at the Bonnaroo Music Festival. Pearl Jam's set at the festival overran by one hour, causing the next act, Kanye West, to take the stage at 4:25 a.m. local time. This was the band's only tour scheduled for 2008. After the tour had concluded, the band played a private benefit show at the Beacon Theatre in New York, which raised $3 million for the Robin Hood Foundation.

Official bootlegs are available for this tour through the band's official website in FLAC, MP3, and CD formats.

Opening acts
Kings of Leon — (June 11 – 17, excluding June 14)
Ted Leo and the Pharmacists — (June 19 – 30)

Tour dates

Festivals and other miscellaneous performances
This concert was a part of "Bonnaroo Music Festival"

Success
Top 100 North American Tours 2008: #86
Total Gross: US $10.7 million
Total Attendance: 200,750
No. of shows: 12

Band members
Pearl Jam
Jeff Ament – bass guitar
Stone Gossard – rhythm guitar
Mike McCready – lead guitar
Eddie Vedder – lead vocals, guitar
Matt Cameron – drums

Additional musicians
Boom Gaspar – Hammond B3 and keyboards

Gallery

References

2008 concert tours
Pearl Jam concert tours